Die Verbrechen des Professor Capellari is a German television series.

See also
List of German television series

External links
 

German crime television series
1998 German television series debuts
2004 German television series endings
Television shows set in Bavaria
German-language television shows
ZDF original programming